Nagpur district (Marathi pronunciation: [naːɡpuːɾ]) is a district in the Vidarbha region of Maharashtra state in central India. The city of Nagpur is the district administrative centre. The district is part of Nagpur Division. 

Nagpur district is bounded by Bhandara district on the east, Chandrapur district on the southeast, Wardha district on the southwest, Amravati district on the northwest and Chhindwara district and Seoni district of Madhya Pradesh state on the north.

Officer

Members of Parliament

Nitin Gadkari (BJP) 
Krupal Tumane (BSS)

Guardian Minister

list of Guardian Minister

District Magistrate/Collector

list of District Magistrate / Collector

History
In 1853, after the death of RaghojiIII, the princely state of Nagpur was annexed by the British and the territory occupied by the present district became part of the then Nagpur Province. In 1861, it was merged with the Central Provinces. In 1903 it became part of the Central Provinces and Berar. In 1950 Nagpur district was created as became part of the newly formed Madhya Pradesh state and Nagpur became its capital. In 1956, after a reorganisation of Indian states, Nagpur district was incorporated into Bombay state. On 1May 1960, it became a district of Maharashtra state.

Geography

Climate

Divisions
Nagpur district is divided into 14 talukas: Ramtek, Umred, Kalameshwar, Katol, Kamthi, Kuhi, Narkhed, Nagpur, Nagpur Rural, Parseoni, Bhiwapur, Mouda, Savner and Hingna.

Nagpur district has 12 Vidhan Sabha constituencies: Nagpur South West, Nagpur South, Nagpur East, Nagpur Central, Nagpur West, Nagpur North, Katol, Savner, Hingna, Umred, Kamthi and Ramtek. The first six constituencies are part of Nagpur Lok Sabha constituency and rest are part of Ramtek Lok Sabha constituency.

Demographics

According to the 2011 census Nagpur district had a population of 4,653,570, roughly equal to the nation of Ireland or the US state of South Carolina. This gives it a ranking of 29th in India (out of a total of 640). Its population growth rate over the decade 2001–2011 was  14.39%. Nagpur has a sex ratio of 948 females for every 1000 males, and a literacy rate of 89.52%. 68.31% of the population lived in urban areas. Scheduled Castes and Scheduled Tribes made up 18.65% and 9.40% of the population respectively.

 

At the time of the 2011 Census of India, 70.11% of the population spoke Marathi, 17.71% Hindi, 4.20% Urdu, 1.39% Chhattisgarhi, 1.09% Gondi and 0.97% Sindhi as their first language.

Urban areas 
The current District Collector is Abhishek Krishna. Nagpur district is made up of the following administrative bodies:
 Nagpur Municipal Corporation
 Nagpur Improvement Trust
 Narkhed Municipal Council
 Katol Municipal Council
 Saoner Municipal Council
 Ramtek Municipal Council
 Mowad Municipal Council
 Khapa Municipal Council
 Umred Municipal Council
 Narkhed Municipal Council
 Kalmeshwar Municipal Council
 Kamptee municipal Council

Transport

Due to its central location in India, the Nagpur Railway Station is an important railway junction. It is a transit terminal for trains that connect the country lengthwise and breadthwise, especially trains connecting India's major metropolises, Mumbai to Howrah-Kolkata, Delhi and Jammu to Chennai, Hyderabad, Bangalore and Kanyakumari in the South, as well as western cities such as Pune and Ahmedabad.

Nagpur is also a major road junction as India's two major national highways, Kanyakumari-Varanasi (NH 7) and Hajira-Kolkata (NH6), pass through the city. Highway number69 connects Nagpur to Obaidullaganj near Bhopal. Nagpur is at the junction of Asian HigLanka and AH46 connecting Kharagpur to Dhule.

The MSRTC buses run a cheap transport service in and around the district, reaching out to even the most remote areas of the district.

Dr. Babasaheb Ambedkar International Airport in Sonegaon, Nagpur, is a domestic and international airport, which connects Nagpur to Mumbai, Delhi, Sharjah, Dubai and Muscat via Doha .

References

External links

 Official website

 
Districts of Maharashtra
Nagpur division
Coal mining districts in India
Vidarbha